Moncef Chargui (born 7 August 1958) is a former Tunisia international football defender who played club football in Tunisia. He is a football manager and has led clubs in Tunisia and Bahrain.

Club career
Born in Tunisia, Chargui played football in the national league for Club Africain.

Career as manager
After retiring from playing football, Chargui became a manager. He led Club Africain, Etoile Olympique de la Goulette et Kram and Jendouba Sport in the local league before joining Bahraini side Al-Shabab. In 2003, he was appointed to replace former Club Africain manager Muhsin Ertuğral, leading the club to the semi-finals of the 2003 CAF Cup. He joined Espérance Sportive de Zarzis in 2007.

International career
Chargui made several appearances for the Tunisia national football team, including one FIFA World Cup qualifying match. He also played for Tunisia at the 1977 FIFA World Youth Championship finals in Tunisia.

References

External links

1958 births
Living people
Tunisian footballers
Tunisia youth international footballers
Tunisia international footballers
Club Africain players
Association football defenders
Tunisian football managers
Club Africain football managers
Jendouba Sport managers
ES Zarzis managers
Tunisian expatriate football managers
Expatriate football managers in Bahrain
Tunisian expatriate sportspeople in Bahrain